Ballycuirke Lough, also known as Ballyquirke Lough, is a freshwater lake in the west of Ireland. It is part of the Lough Corrib catchment in County Galway.

Geography and natural history
The lake is a pike fishing destination.

See also
List of loughs in Ireland

References

Ballycuirke